The following is a list of ice hockey players from Slovakia who played or are playing in the National Hockey League (NHL). It is sorted by all-time points scored.

Since the 1958–59 season, 84 Slovak forwards and defencemen have played at least one game in the NHL. Also, five goalies native to Slovakia have appeared in games.

At the top of this list, there is additionally the unranked Stan Mikita. Stan Mikita was born in Slovakia, but left at the age of eight. He learned to play hockey in Canada and represented Canada internationally, so his first place may be disputed by some sources. All other players started their pro-careers in Europe.

Active players currently playing in the NHL are in bold.

All-time scoring leaders

Statistics are correct to the end of 2021-22

Goalies
 Jaroslav Halák: 556 games – 31 849 minutes – 285W-180L-64OTL –  52 Shutouts – GAA: 2.49
 Peter Budaj: 368 games – 20 216 minutes – 158W-132L-40OTL – 18 Shutouts – GAA: 2.70
 Rastislav Staňa: 6 games – 211 minutes – 1W-2L – 0 Shutouts – GAA: 3.13
 Jan Lašák: 6 games – 267 minutes – 0W-4L – 0 Shutouts – GAA: 4.04
 Adam Huska: 1 game – 60 minutes, – 0W-1L – 0 Shutouts – GAA: 7.04

See also
List of NHL players
List of NHL statistical leaders by country
Slovakia national ice hockey team

External links
 Slovak NHL Player Leaderboard

Slovaks
 
NHL